Pergolesi is a surname. Notable people with the surname include:

Giovanni Battista Pergolesi, (1710–1736), Italian composer, violinist, and organist
Michael Angelo Pergolesi, 18th-century Italian decorative artist

Italian-language surnames